Hypsopygia rudis is a species of snout moth in the genus Hypsopygia. It was described by Frederic Moore in 1888. It is found in Taiwan and India.

References

Moths described in 1888
Pyralini